Agladrillia flucticulus is a species of sea snail, a marine gastropod mollusk in the family Drilliidae.

Description
The shell grows to a length of  12 mm.

Distribution
This species occurs in the Pacific Ocean from Mexico to Panama.

References

 McLean & Poorman, 1971. New species of Tropical Eastern Pacific Turridae; The Veliger, 14, 89–113

External links
 
 BioLib: Agladrillia flucticulus

flucticulus
Gastropods described in 1971